The Projection Booth is a podcast featuring discussions of films from a variety of genres with critical analysis. , more than 500 episodes had been released.

The show is hosted by Mike White, the director of Who Do You Think You're Fooling?. Guests on the show have included Jeff Goldblum, John Waters, Ed Harris, Luke Wilson, Chris Elliott, Ellen Burstyn, Bruce Dern, Nicholas Meyer, William Friedkin, Julie Taymor, and Joe Dante.

Format 
Each show contains a discussion of a single main film. Sometimes other films that complement or contrast the main topic are discussed. Often, guest interviews are included. Guests have included other podcast hosts, authors, or people with particular insights on a given film or topic, and at times, the filmmakers themselves.

Episode lengths vary; many are less than an hour, but episodes have reached up to seven hours.

Some of the show's most popular episodes include shows on The Magnificent Ambersons, and Conan the Barbarian.

While covering a wide array of films, the show has been criticized for occasionally dedicating episodes to obscure films not available on DVD.

History 
The podcast started when the original hosts, Mike White and Justin Bozung, were driving from Detroit to the 2010 B Movie Celebration in Franklin, Indiana and discussing their favorite, and least favorite, film podcasts.

Bozung left the show after the Hickey & Boggs episode. After a series of guest co-hosts, Rob St. Mary became a semi-permanent co-host. St. Mary's first full-time show was the  episode on Frankenhooker. He left his full-time spot following the  episode on Shadow of a Doubt.

The Projection Booth has been highlighted by The Washington Post, The A.V. Club, IndieWire, Entertainment Weekly, Filmmaker, and Mental Floss  as one of the best film and movie podcasts available.

Though not specifically a horror film podcast, The Projection Booth has been nominated multiple times for the Rondo Hatton Classic Horror Awards.

Hosts 
Mike White is a writer from Detroit, Michigan, who started the Cashiers du Cinemart zine in 1994. Best known for his work Who Do You Think You're Fooling?, White has appeared in documentaries such as David Goodis: To A Pulp and The People vs. George Lucas. In 2003, White was part of the panel discussion at the Rue Morgue Festival of Fear, "Misadventures in Horror Podcasting".

The show also has a "Robohost", developed by Bell Laboratories. Robohost is a computer program that continuously updates with all episodes of The Projection Booth podcast as well as anything written about or said about the show on other podcasts. Robohost has made appearances on the episodes Auschwitz and American Mary.

Co-hosts
Revolving co-hosts since 2014 include film critic and author Maitland McDonagh, David Kittredge, Chris Stachiw, Samm Deighan, Skizz Cyzyk, Chris Cummins, Heather "Boom Boom" Drain, and Kat Ellinger.

Former 
The show was formerly co-hosted by Rob St. Mary and Justin Bozung. St. Mary is a writer who worked at WDET Public Radio in Detroit. He produced the horror-comedy Tainted which was released via Troma Entertainment in 1998. After the publication of his book Re-Entry: The Orbit Book Anthology, he left full-time hosting but returns for select discussions. Bozung, also known as "Mondo Justin", was the creator of the Mondo Film & Video Guide. He was on episodes 1 (The Stunt Man) to episode 36 (Hickey & Boggs). He has also hosted his own podcast.

Related Shows 
White is also the co-host of other podcasts including The Kolchak Tapes (focused on Kolchak: The Night Stalker), Dreams for Sale (focused on The Twilight Zone (1985 TV series)), The Life & Times of Captain Barney Miller (focused on Barney Miller), and The Shabby Detective: Yet Another Columbo Podcast.

Episodes

References

External links 

Film and television podcasts
Audio podcasts
2011 podcast debuts
Interview podcasts